General elections were held in Gibraltar on 26 November 2015 to elect all 17 members to the third Gibraltar Parliament. Chief Minister Fabian Picardo announced the date of the election on Monday 19 October 2015 during a speech on the Gibraltar Broadcasting Corporation.

Background
Under section 38(2) of the Gibraltar Constitution Order 2006, the parliament must be dissolved by the Governor four years after its first meeting following the last election (unless the Chief Minister advises the Governor to dissolve parliament sooner). Under section 37 of the Constitution, writs for a general election must be issued within thirty days of the dissolution and the general election must then be held no later than three months after the issuing of a writ. In October 2015, Chief Minister Fabian Picardo announced that the election would take place on 26 November. Following the British tradition, elections in Gibraltar conventionally take place on a Thursday.

Campaign
The UK-based UK Independence Party announced in 2014 that it was planning on fielding candidates for the first time in Gibraltar's next general election. However, ultimately they did not field any candidates. There were also no independents.

Opinion polls
A GBC public opinion poll of 17 November predicted 67% for GSLP/Libs and 33% for GSD.

Results
The results saw the first occasion on which a party received over 100,000 votes. Both the GSLP and LPG received more votes in the elections than in any other previous general elections, with the LPG receiving the highest percentage of votes in its history. Contrastingly, the GSD saw the largest drop in its vote share in its history. Voter turnout (70.77%) was the lowest since 1980.

By candidate

References

Gibraltar
General
General elections in Gibraltar
Gibraltar